Francisco de Paredes (1512–1560s) was a Spanish conquistador, who attended the founding of Buenos Aires and Asuncion.

He was born in Burgos, Spain, the son of Andrés de Paredes and Leonor del Río, belonging to a distinguished Castilian family from Burgos. He arrived in the Río de la Plata in the expedition of Pedro de Mendoza, with his brother, the canon Lesmes de Paredes.

Francisco de Paredes was the ancestor of Potenciana de Paredes, a paternal grandmother of Casimiro Alegre, a prominent Spanish colonial official of Buenos Aires.

References 

1512 births
1560s deaths
Spanish colonial governors and administrators
Explorers of Argentina
Spanish explorers of South America
Spanish conquistadors